James Su Zhi-Ming is the Roman Catholic bishop of the diocese of Baoding, China.

Early life 
James was born on 10 July 1932.

Priesthood 
He was ordained a priest on 12 April 1981.

Episcopate 
James was selected as Auxiliary Bishop of Baoding, China in 1988. He was selected as Coadjutor Bishop of Baoding and consecrated as bishop on 2 May 1993 by Bishop Peter Liu Guandong. On 21 December 1995, he was appointed Bishop of the Roman Catholic diocese of Baoding.

Arrest and disappearance 
Chinese officials arrested him and have not disclosed his whereabouts to the media. Su was imprisoned in 1997, and his location had remained unknown until November 15, 2003, when he was seen in a Baoding hospital. He has since disappeared from public view once more.

See also
 List of people who disappeared

References

21st-century Roman Catholic bishops in China
Living people
1932 births